Wang Zhenduo (1911–1992), whose courtesy name was Tianmu, was a Chinese historian, archaeologist and museologist, and is considered one of the founders of the history of Chinese technology.

Early life and education 
Wang was born in Baoding, Hebei Province into a wealthy land-owning family.  His father, Wang Zongxi, was a military engineer and his grandfather, Wang Yingkai, was a high ranking Qing Dynasty general. He graduated from Yanjing University in 1934.

Study of Chinese technology 
Wang was noted for his contributions to the understanding of ancient Chinese technology, including his 1936 reconstruction of Zhang Heng's seismograph.

Politics 
Wang was elected to the third National People's Congress, and the fifth, sixth and seventh Chinese People's Political Consultative Conference.

References 

Historians from Hebei
Chinese archaeologists
Museologists
1911 births
1992 deaths
Politicians from Baoding
People's Republic of China politicians from Hebei
Scientists from Hebei
Writers from Baoding
20th-century archaeologists